Window Seat is a 2022 Indian Kannada-language mystery thriller directed by Sheetal Shetty which stars Nirup Bhandari, Sanjana Anand and Amrutha Iyengar in lead roles. The music is composed by Arjun Janya.

Cast 
Nirup Bhandari as Raghu
Sanjana Anand as Maya
Amrutha Iyengar as Anjali 
Ravishankar Gowda 
Madhusudhan Rao
Lekha Naidu

Soundtrack 
The soundtrack album has three singles composed by Arjun Janya, and released on Anand Audio.

Release
The film was released on 1 July 2022. The digital distribution rights of the film were acquired by ZEE5. The film started streaming digitally on ZEE5 from 218 October 2022.

References

External links 
 
 Window Seat on ZEE5

Indian romantic drama films
2020s Kannada-language films
2022 films
2022 romantic drama films
Films shot in Karnataka
Indian gangster films